Rose is a cocktail made of vermouth, Kirschwasser (cherry eau de vie) and fruit syrup (strawberry, raspberry or redcurrant). Some recipes include cherry liqueur and gin.

The Rose cocktail was popular in 1920s Paris and was created by Johnny Mitta, barman at the Chatham Hotel. A recipe for it can be found in a 1927 book by Harry McElhone, owner of Harry's New York Bar in Paris.

References

Cocktails with vermouth